The European Union–Sudan relations are the international relations between the European Union (EU) and the Republic of the Sudan.

History 
European Economic Community (EEC) cooperation with Sudan—a member of the Organisation of African, Caribbean and Pacific States (ACP)—ran under the aegis of the Lomé Convention. Following the 1989 Sudanese coup d'état and ensuing violation of human rights the European Community suspended development aid in March 1990. In absence of a legal framework for development, bar the humanitarian assistance funds provided via ECHO, relations were put on hold. In 1999, dialogue resumed.

Following the Sudanese revolution and the installment of a civilian-led government in September 2019, the EU has pledged support to the consolidation of the Sudanese transition to democracy. In June 2020, the EU co-hosted the High-Level Sudan Partnership Conference, where the EU Commission pledged 312 million euros to help crisis-stricken Sudan in addition to the economic support offered by the individual EU member states.

References 
Citations

Bibliography
 
 

EU
Sudan